Europiella is a genus of plant bugs in the family Miridae. There are more than 30 described species in Europiella.

Species
These 38 species belong to the genus Europiella:

 Europiella albipennis (Fallén, 1829)
 Europiella alpina (Reuter, 1875)
 Europiella angulata (Uhler, 1895)
 Europiella arizonae Knight, 1968
 Europiella artemisiae (Becker, 1864)
 Europiella bakeri (Bergroth, 1898)
 Europiella canoflavida (Qi & Nonnaizab, 1993)
 Europiella carvalhoi Schuh in Schuh, Lindskog & Kerzhner, 1995
 Europiella concinna Reuter, 1909
 Europiella consors (Uhler, 1895)
 Europiella decolor (Uhler, 1893)
 Europiella gilva (Kulik, 1965)
 Europiella herbaalbae (Wagner, 1969)
 Europiella indochinana Duwal, Yasunaga & Lee, 2017
 Europiella kiritshenkoi (Kulik, 1975)
 Europiella langtangensis Duwal, Yasunaga & Lee, 2010
 Europiella lattini Schuh, 2004
 Europiella leucopus (Kerzhner, 1979)
 Europiella livida (Reuter, 1906)
 Europiella miyamotoi (Kerzhner, 1988)
 Europiella moesta (Reuter, 1906)
 Europiella morrisoni Schuh, 2004
 Europiella nigricornis Knight, 1968
 Europiella nigrocunealis (V.Putshkov, 1975)
 Europiella ovatula (Wagner, 1952)
 Europiella pilosula (Uhler, 1893)
 Europiella pintoi Schuh, 2004
 Europiella puspae Duwal, Yasunaga & Lee, 2010
 Europiella senjoensis (Linnavuori, 1961)
 Europiella signicornis Knight, 1969
 Europiella stigmosa (Uhler, 1893)
 Europiella strawinskii (Sienkiewicz, 1986)
 Europiella strigifemur (Wagner, 1964)
 Europiella tomentosa (Reuter, 1888)
 Europiella umbrina Reuter, 1909
 Europiella unipuncta Knight, 1968
 Europiella unipunctata Knight
 Europiella yampae Knight, 1968

References

Further reading

External links

 

Phylini
Articles created by Qbugbot